Lordship is a small, waterfront neighborhood situated on Connecticut's Gold Coast in Stratford, Connecticut. It was listed as a census-designated place prior to the 2020 census. Lordship was an island bounded by salt marshes to the north and Long Island Sound to the south, The neighborhood currently extends, by man made fill, as a peninsula on Long Island Sound and is bounded from the rest of Stratford by Sikorsky Memorial Airport to the north and Short Beach to the north east. Lordship is accessible by only two roads, both parts of Route 113.

Lordship is home to the Stratford Point Light.

History 
The first inhabitants of Lordship were the Paugussetts who had a large village at Frash Pond and smaller encampments at Stratford Point and at Indian Well (areas in Lordship). Indian Well was a fresh water pond where the old trolley line crossed Duck Neck Creek just north of the rotary near the firehouse. When the first settlers arrived in 1639, they found that Indians were using this area to plant corn, so there was little clearing necessary. Lordship, originally called Great Neck, was a “Common Field” worked and owned by settlers who returned home to the safety of the palisade fort at Academy Hill at night. Richard Mills was the first to build a farmhouse in Great Neck in the western end near present-day Second Avenue. He sold his estate to Joseph Hawley (Captain) in 1650 and moved. It is in connection with his name that the term Lordship is first found, as applied to a meadow on what is still known as the Lordship farm. It is said in deeds of land - 1650 to 1660 – several times, Mill’s Lordship and the Lordship Meadow. Richard Beach came to Stratford with a family and in 1662, he purchased one of five acres on west point of the Neck, butted south upon the meadow called Mill’s Lordship.

Gustave Whitehead is reported to have used the windswept sandy areas of Lordship during some of his early powered flight trials in the early 1900s.

References

External links
Lordship History

Stratford, Connecticut
Peninsulas of Connecticut
Landforms of Fairfield County, Connecticut
Populated places in Fairfield County, Connecticut
Neighborhoods in Connecticut
Census-designated places in Fairfield County, Connecticut
Census-designated places in Connecticut